Ny Vestergade (lit. English: New West Street) is a street in central Copenhagen, Denmark. It runs from Frederiksholms Kanal to Vester Voldgade and together with Christiansborg's riding grounds, Marble Bridge and Dantes Plads forms an axis between Christiansborg's tower in the east and Ny Carlsberg Glyptotek's dome in the west. The National Museum's main entrance is located in the street.

History
Ny Vestergade is one of the streets that was created when the Frederiksholm neighbourhood was established in the 1660s. It is referred to as Den Nye Vestergade ("The New West Street") in 1665 but was long more commonly called Wigandts Gade after wine trader and ship owner Wigand Michelbecker (1636-1692), who owned a property where National Museum is now located. The name "New" refers to the old Vestergade, which extends westwards from Gammeltorv.

Notable buildings and residents
 
 
 
The National Museum occupies the entire north side of the street. The recessed main entrance was created by Mogens Clemmensen, Arne Nystrøm and Gehrdt Bornebusch in connection with their expansions of the museum between 1929 and 1938.

No. 9, 11 and 13 are listed. Dating from some time before 1770, Ny Vestergade 9 is the oldest house in the street. The two-storey No. 11 was built as a combined storage house and stables for grocer I. Lund in 1831. University of Copenhagen acquired the building in 1857 and it was subsequently adapted by Johan Henrik Nebelong in the Neoclassical style (1858). Nebelong also added a perpendicular rear wing (1859), which housed the university's chemical laboratory. A memorial plaque commemorates that August Krogh lived and worked in the building from 1910 until 1827. No. 13 was built in 1793 for inn-keeper Christen Christensen Bording, probably by one of Caspar Frederik Harsdorff's pupils. A later owner, Christian Ludvig Maag, expanded the house with an extra floor in  1855–1857. Maag also commissioned Georg Hilker, P. C. Skovgaard and Constantin Hansen. Countess Danner had an apartment in the building. The building is now part of Dansk Arbejdersgiverforening's headquarters on Vester Voldgade.

Public art and memorials
 
In the courtyard of Ny Vestergade 1 is a water feature with an antique statue. Above the statue is a round relief. The tableaux is visible through the gateway from the street. The walls of the gateway feature four more reliefs. The building is from 1870.

See also
 Ny Vestergade 11

References

External links

 Source
 Ny Vestergade 11
 Source

Streets in Copenhagen